The following is a list of courts and tribunals in Queensland :

 Supreme Court of Queensland 
 Queensland Court of Appeal
 Supreme Court (Trial Division)
 Court of Disputed Returns
 District Court of Queensland
 Magistrates' Court of Queensland
 Children's Court of Queensland
 Coroners Court of Queensland
 Industrial Court of Queensland
 Queensland Industrial Relations Commission
 Land Court
Land Appeal Court
 Queensland Civil and Administrative Tribunal
 Planning and Environment Court
Specialist courts:
 Drug and Alcohol Court
 Mental Health Court
 Murri Court (in both Magistrates and Children's Courts)
 Specialist Domestic Violence Court at Southport

Queensland
 
Courts and tribunals